The Lost Boys is an American multimedia franchise that began with the 1987 Warner Bros. film The Lost Boys, written by Janice Fischer, James Jeremias, and Jeffrey Boam. The film was directed by Joel Schumacher and produced by Harvey Bernhard. Starring Corey Haim, Jason Patric, Kiefer Sutherland, Jami Gertz, Corey Feldman, Dianne Wiest, Edward Herrmann, Alex Winter, Jamison Newlander, and Barnard Hughes, the story revolves around two brothers who move to a new town and end up fighting a gang of young vampires. The film was followed by two direct-to-DVD sequels, Lost Boys: The Tribe (2008) and Lost Boys: The Thirst (2010).

A novelization of the first film was published in the same year as the film's release. A monthly comic book miniseries, Lost Boys: Reign of Frogs, was also produced in 2008 with the story serving as a lead-in to the first film sequel, Lost Boys: The Tribe. A reboot of the film is currently in the works with Jonathan Entwistle set to direct and Noah Jupe and Jaeden Martell set to star.

Media

Films

The original The Lost Boys was released in 1987 and starred Jason Patric, Corey Haim, Kiefer Sutherland, Jami Gertz, Corey Feldman, Dianne Wiest, Edward Herrmann, Alex Winter, Jamison Newlander, and Barnard Hughes. A direct-to-DVD sequel, Lost Boys: The Tribe, was released in 2008. Corey Feldman returned as Edgar Frog, with a cameo by Corey Haim as Sam Emerson. Kiefer Sutherland's half-brother Angus Sutherland plays the lead vampire. A third film entitled Lost Boys: The Thirst, with Feldman serving as an executive producer in addition to playing Edgar Frog, and Newlander returning as Alan Frog was released on DVD in 2010.

After the first film's initial release there were plans to make a sequel named The Lost Girls just two years after with David returning as the villain but the plans never came to fruition. Scripts for this and other sequels circulated, and the original film's director, Joel Schumacher, made several attempts at a sequel during the 1990s. There were also plans for a fourth film after the release of the third film but was cancelled after the folding of its production company.

A reboot of the franchise is currently in development, with Noah Jupe and Jaeden Martell starring as the leads, Randy McKinnon penning the script, and Jonathan Entwistle as the director.

Novels
The original film was novelized by Craig Shaw Gardner. It was released in paperback by Berkley Publishing and is 220 pages long.

Comic books
In 2008, a four-issue comic book mini-series named Lost Boys: Reign of Frogs was released from May to August. It was published by Wildstorm and the story is set between The Lost Boys and Lost Boys: The Tribe. The plot revolves around the Frog brothers in their further adventures hunting vampires. A second comic series was named simply The Lost Boys was released in October 2016 by Vertigo, this too a miniseries, where Michael, Sam and the Frog Brothers must protect Star from her sisters, the Blood Belles.

TV pilot 
In August 2016, a television adaptation of The Lost Boys was revealed to be in the works at The CW, to be developed by writer Rob Thomas in association with Gulfstream Television and Warner Bros. Television (WBTV). In addition to writing, Thomas was to executive produce the project via Spondoolie Productions, alongside his frequent collaborators Danielle Stokdyk and Dan Etheridge, as well as Gulfstream's Mike Karz and Bill Bindley. Juliana Janes, the head of Gulfstream Television, was instrumental in putting the project together and oversaw the project for the company. Gulfstream originally pitched the idea to remake The Lost Boys as a television series through the company's overall deal with WBTV. Also under an overall deal with WBTV, Thomas later boarded the project with a new take on the film and, with two networks pursuing, Thomas' pitch landed at The CW.

A re-imagining of the original film, the series was imagined as a seven-season anthology-style story spanning 70 years, with each season chronicling a decade. The first season was to be set in San Francisco during the Summer of Love in 1967. The series' setting, antagonists, human characters, and story would change each season, with only the titular vampires remaining the same as the series was to explore what it really means to be immortal. While the project did not go to pilot during the 2016-17 development season, the network remained invested in the property. As Thomas became preoccupied with his work on his Veronica Mars revival, Heather Mitchell joined The Lost Boys as a writer and executive producer to redevelop the project, which landed a pilot order in January 2019. The new logline for the series read:

In February, Catherine Hardwicke was hired to direct the pilot episode and the two of the three lead roles had been cast with Tyler Posey as Michael Emerson, one of the brothers, and Kiele Sanchez as their mother, Lucy Emerson. Medalion Rahimi and Dakota Shapiro were additionally announced in main roles as Stella and David, respectively. Posey, Sanchez, and Shapiro took on roles that were previously played by Jason Patric, Dianne Wiest, and Kiefer Sutherland in the original film, while Rahimi's Stella is a version of the Star character played by Jami Gertz. Casting continued with Sarah Hay, Cheyenne Haynes, and Haley Tju added as series regulars. Hay was cast as Mollie, a vampire turned by David who has become his rival for leadership of the vampire gang. Meanwhile, Haynes and Tju were tapped to portray the Frog Sisters, Liza and Cassie, respectively. The characters are a gender-flipped version of the Frog Brothers, Edgar and Alan Frog, played by Corey Feldman and Jamison Newlander, respectively, in the original film. In March, Rio Mangini joined the main cast as Sam Emerson, one of the lead brothers, alongside Del Zamora as Frank Garcia, Lucy's father.

After The CW passed on the pilot in May, once again deciding to retool the project though this time off-cycle, Warner Bros. Television released the entire cast of the pilot the following month with the exception of Rahimi and Shapiro, whose options were extended. The duo were set to co-star in the new, reworked pilot, which was scheduled to film by the end of 2019. The second pilot began filming but was affected by the 2019 COVID-19 pandemic. Despite this the pilot was pretty much finished, but was also not accepted in 15 May 2020. Nonetheless, CW continued to emphasize the project as a passion project. In January 2021, the latest pilot was stated to still be in consideration, but in September, it was officially confirmed that The CW would not move forward with the project.

Stage
A prequel musical began development in 2017. Composer Gerard McMahon stated that the musical was almost done and was originally scheduled to premiere in 2022.

Cast
 A dark gray cell indicates the character was not in the film.

Music
The score for the original film was composed by Thomas Newman. The theme song, "Cry Little Sister", was originally recorded by Gerard McMahon (under his pseudonym Gerard McMann) for the soundtrack. In the film's sequel, "Cry Little Sister" was covered by a Seattle-based rock band, Aiden. Lou Gramm, lead singer of Foreigner recorded the song "Lost in the Shadows" for the soundtrack, along with a video which featured clips from the film. The soundtrack also featured several popular songs.

The score for the second film was composed by Nathan Barr. A soundtrack of songs by various artists was released by Adrenaline Records on July 22, 2008. The album includes a cover version of "Cry Little Sister" by Aiden.

The music for the third film was composed by Elia Cmíral.

Merchandise
The lead vampire David has been produced as an action figure by the National Entertainment Collectibles Association as part of their Cult Classics Movie Figures. Michael also received a figure.

See also
 Vampire films

References

External links

 
 
 
 Box Office History for Lost Boys Movies at the-numbers.com

 
Warner Bros. Pictures franchises
Film franchises introduced in 1987
Horror film franchises
American teen horror films
American film series